Gerhard "Gerd" Zimmermann (born 23 September 1942) is a retired German speed skater. He competed at the 1964, 1968 and 1972 Winter Olympics in the 500, 1500, 5000 and 1000 m distances (eight events in total), for Germany and then for West Germany. His best achievements were seventh and eighth place in the 10000 m in 1964 and 1972, respectively.

Between 1964 and 1972 he won eight West German all-around titles.

He married Hildegard Sellhuber, a West German speed skater who also competed at the 1968 Olympics.

Personal bests:
 500 m – 39.7 (1972)
 1000 m – 1:20.5 (1972)
 1500 m – 2:03.3 (1972)
 5000 m – 7:21.6 (1969)
 10000 m – 15:23.3 (1969)

References

1942 births
Living people
German male speed skaters
Olympic speed skaters of the United Team of Germany
Olympic speed skaters of West Germany
Speed skaters at the 1964 Winter Olympics
Speed skaters at the 1968 Winter Olympics
Speed skaters at the 1972 Winter Olympics
20th-century German people